Parlington Hall was the seat of the Gascoigne family, Aberford near Leeds in West Yorkshire, England.

The Parlington estate contains a number of features: the grade II* listed Triumphal Arch, designed by Thomas Leverton and built around the end of the Eighteenth Century, which is unique in commemorating the victory of the American colonialists over the British in the American War of Independence. An inscription on both faces of the arch reads, "Liberty in N.America Triumphant MDCCLXXXIII"; a tunnel known locally as the "Dark Arch", which was built to shield the inhabitants of the hall from traffic passing along Parlington Lane, still intact almost two hundred years later; an underground icehouse, also intact — a testament to Georgian brick construction.

History
The Parlington estate was acquired by the Gascoignes from the Wentworth family in 1546. The hall was modified by successive family members, before it was abandoned in the early years of the twentieth century it was a culmination of alterations by Sir Edward Gascoigne (early eighteenth century), his son Sir Thomas Gascoigne the last baronet (late eighteenth century), Richard Oliver-Gascoigne (early nineteenth century) and last by Isabella and her husband Frederick in the mid and late nineteenth century. The extent of the mansion by the turn of the twentieth century, its mixed architecture and myriad of materials presented an incoherent design, perhaps only improved by the highly regarded landscaped gardens, often cited in local newspaper articles. Sadly after it was abandoned the incremental demolition between the second decade of the twentieth century and the late nineteen fifties destroyed any ability to determine the age of the earliest parts of the property, most of that seen in any photographs is later than the seventeenth century.

Sir Thomas Gascoigne, 8th and last Baronet, succeeded his brother in 1762. Sir Thomas was M.P. for Thirsk from 1780 to 1784, for Malton in 1784 and for Arundel in 1795. He was also a keen breeder and trainer of horses and with Sir Thomas Stapleton won the St Leger Stakes in 1778 with Hollandoise and the same race twenty years later with his home-bred colt Symmetry. He supported the cause of American Independence and built a commemorative arch to the American Victory in the War of Independence, thought to be modelled on the Arch of Constantine in Rome, at the entrance to the estate.

The death in February 1810 of Sir Thomas Gascoigne the last baronet, aged 65 came just a few months after his heir and only child Tom had pre-deceased him as a result of an accident whilst hunting. Sir Thomas had a new will prepared and his step-daughter, Mary (second child of Sir Charles Turner and Mary Turner) benefitted with her husband Richard Oliver in a lifetime interest in the estates, a proviso being that the family took on the name of Gascoigne and that they had issue; thereafter Richard Oliver-Gascoigne, presided over the properties, Mary died in 1819, but by then they had four children, two sons and two daughters, both sons, pre-deceased Richard Oliver Gascoigne and the daughters Isabella and Elizabeth inherited all the estates in 1843. During his time at Parlington, Richard continued the racing interests of Sir Thomas, winning the St Leger in 1811 with Soothsayer and in 1824 with Jerry. He was responsible for building the "Dark Arch" in 1813 and was High Sheriff of Yorkshire for 1816–17.

Isabella and Elizabeth, two deeply creative women immediately commissioned the building of schools, almshouses and churches in the region and made huge improvements to their estates and to the living conditions of their tenantry. The sisters personally fabricated spectacular stained glass windows for their various projects. One of these survives in the park at Parlington. Isabella's particular interest was wood-turning and she installed at least three lathes in her own workshop at Parlington, as well as writing an authoritative book on the subject. In 1850, Isabella married Colonel Frederick Charles Trench of Woodlawn, County Galway, Ireland. In 1852, Elizabeth married Frederick's cousin Frederick Mason Trench, 2nd Baron Ashtown, head of the Trench family. Jointly the two sisters had already built the magnificent Castle Oliver on their father's estate in Limerick, Ireland. Elizabeth and her husband lived at Castle Oliver, while Isabella and her husband continued to reside at Parlington Hall until her death in 1891.

Following the death of Isabella's husband in June 1905, Parlington Hall was abandoned. Their son Col. Frederick Richard Thomas Trench-Gascoigne was already established at another nearby family residence, Lotherton Hall to the east of Aberford, which he had inherited on the death of his Aunt Elizabeth. After 1905, much of the contents and smaller architectural features of Parlington were transferred to Lotherton and Parlington was largely demolished in the 1950s and 1960s, leaving only the west wing standing. Lotherton Hall, which lies on the road towards Towton, contains much Gascoigne memorabilia and is open to the public.

References

The History of Parlington Hall and its surroundings, including the Triumphal Arch, Dark Arch and Ice House
Castle Oliver & the Oliver Gascoignes by Nicholas Browne (contains much information about the various branches of the Gascoigne family as well as their connections with Castle Oliver in Limerick, Ireland).
http://www.castle-oliver.com
http://www.leeds.gov.uk/lothertonhall

Country houses in West Yorkshire
British country houses destroyed in the 20th century
Demolished buildings and structures in England
Buildings and structures demolished in the 1960s